Moltke  is a noble family resident in Germany and Scandinavia.

Moltke may also refer to:

People 
 Erik Moltke (1901–1984), Danish art historian
 Helmuth James Graf von Moltke (1907–1945), German jurist involved in the 1944 assassination attempt against Hitler
 Helmuth von Moltke the Elder (1800–1891), Chief of the Prussian, and then German, General Staff 
 Helmuth von Moltke the Younger (1848–1916), Chief of the German General Staff
 Joachim Godske Moltke (1746–1818), Prime Minister of Denmark
 Kuno von Moltke (1847–1923), German general
 Adam Moltke (disambiguation)

Places 
 Moltke Harbor, South Georgia Island
 Moltke, Ontario, a township in Canada
 Moltke's Palace, alternate name for Amalienborg Palace, the winter home of the Danish royal family
 Moltke Township (disambiguation), several places in the USA

Transportation 
 Moltke (1870), a three-masted barque built in Hamburg, Germany in 1870
 , two German ships named after Moltke the Elder
 , a class of battlecruiser in the German Navy

Other uses 
 Moltke (crater), a crater on the Moon